Lake LeBoeuf is a natural lake approximately 70 acres in size. It is located in Waterford Township immediately adjacent to the Borough of Waterford in Erie County, Pennsylvania.  The lake, with two public boat ramps, is available for public boating and fishing.  Fish species in the lake include black crappie, yellow perch, largemouth bass, muskellunge, walleye, and northern pike.

Like all of the glacial lakes in Pennsylvania, Lake LeBoeuf is a kettle lake. It has a muddy, relatively shallow bottom.  Inlets to the lake include Trout Run and LeBoeuf Creek.  LeBoeuf Creek is the primary outlet.

In 2014, the Pennsylvania Department of Environmental Protection confirmed the presence of the aquatic invasive species commonly known as round goby at Lake LeBoeuf.

References

Lakes of Pennsylvania
Bodies of water of Erie County, Pennsylvania
Kettle lakes in the United States